Saturnin is a Czech comedy film. It was released in 1994.

External links
 

1994 films
1994 comedy films
Czech comedy films